Muirkirk & North Lowther Uplands Special Protection Area is an extensive area of moorland extending south from near Darvel in northern Ayrshire to near Kirkconnel in Dumfries and Galloway. The SPA is of outstanding interest for its variety of upland habitats and breeding birds.

There are large tracts of blanket bog, wet and dry heaths and upland grasslands which provide a diversity of habitats that supports a rich variety of moorland breeding birds.

External links about the Special Protection Area
 Muirkirk
 Birdlife Fact Sheet for Airds Moss and Muirkirk Uplands
 Joint Nature Conservation Committee
 Scottish Executive announcement of launch of SPA on 7 March 2003
 Scottish Natural Heritage
 UK Biodiversity Action Plan for Black Grouse

Protected areas of Dumfries and Galloway
Protected areas of East Ayrshire